HLA-B51 (B51) is an HLA-B serotype. The serotype identifies the more common HLA-B*51 gene products.

B51 is a split antigen of the broad antigen B5, and is a sister serotype of B52. There are many alleles within the B*51 allele group. B51 is associated with several diseases, including Behçet's disease.

Serotype

Alleles
There are 71 alleles, 57 amino acid sequence variants in B51 of which 4 are nulls. Of  these only 9 are frequent enough to have been reliably serotyped. B*5101 is the most common, but others have a large regional abundance.

Disease associations

By serotype
Bw51 was associated with Behçet's disease, in endemic (versus epidemic) mucocutaneous lymph node syndrome, susceptibility to the virus that causes German measles infection.

In Behçet's disease
Behçet's disease is an inflammation of the wall of blood vessels that can involve the eyes, skin, and  the rest of the body. Several alleles of B51 (B*5101, B*5108, B*5105, and B*5104) are found in disease, and linkage to markers, D6S285, in the HLA locus was strong (P<0.005). Homozygotes of B51 showed considerably high risk for disease indicating a possible gene-dose effect.  B51 is capable of distinguishing several varieties of disease. HLA-B51 is found more frequently in disease that has an eye involvement. However it is less common in some regions when there is increased neurological involvement.  The MICA*009 allele has been found to also associated with ABD when B51 is also present, IL-8 and other cytokines may also be involved. Sister chromatid exchange has also been observed more frequently in B51(+) ABD.

However, B51 tends not to be found in ABD when a certain SUMO4 gene variant is involved, and symptoms appear to be milder when HLA-B27 is present.

References

5